10 (sometimes known as Ten) is a compilation album by The Wildhearts frontman Ginger, collecting solo tracks from the previous ten years. The tracks are compiled from the Ginger albums Yoni and Market Harbour, the Silver Ginger 5 release Black Leather Mojo, and the Ginger & the Sonic Circus release Valor Del Corazon. The tracks "No Way Out But Through" and "This Too Will Pass" were previously unreleased.

Ginger also added a second collection of solo tracks, known as 10 (Two), as a free 10-track download, expanding the collection to 26 tracks overall.

Track listing

10 (Two) Track listing

References 

Ginger (musician) compilation albums
2010 compilation albums